Estadio Ebal Rodriguez is a multi-use stadium in Guápiles, Costa Rica.  It is currently used mostly for football matches and is the home stadium of Santos de Guápiles.  The stadium holds 3,000 people.

History
Alajuelense's Wilson Muñoz scored the first Primera División goal scored in the stadium in a 1999 4-0 league win over the hosts.

The stadium is currently undergoing a number of renovations. An artificial pitch has been installed, the building was newly painted, the transmission cabins were improved and a roof for the main stand will follow up. The offices will also be remodeled.  will also be invested in seeking the inspection and approval of the stadium by FIFA for international games.

References

Football venues in Costa Rica
Buildings and structures in Limón Province